Rustam Sohrab is a 1963 Indian Hindi-language film, produced by F.U. Ramsay and directed by Vishram Bedekar. The film has Suraiya as the heroine (in the role of Shehzadi Tehmina) and Prithviraj Kapoor (in the role of Rustom Zabuli) as the hero. The story is based on the legendary poem of Rostam and Sohrab by Persian poet Ferdowsi. Prem Nath plays the role of Sohrab, Rustam's son and Mumtaz plays the role of Shahroo, Sohrab's love. The film has music by Sajjad Hussain.

It was the last film of Suraiya, after which she gave up acting and singing altogether. In the film, she sang her swan song "Ye kaisi ajab dastan ho gayi hai", which is regarded as one of her greatest hits.

Cast
Suraiya as Shehzadi Tehmina
Prithviraj Kapoor as Rustom Zabuli
Prem Nath as Sohrab
Mumtaz as Shahroo

Soundtrack

References

External links
 
Rustam Sohrab (1963 film) on Complete Index To World Film (CITWF) website
Rustam Sohrab (1963 film) on Muvyz.com website

1963 films
1960s Hindi-language films
Films scored by Sajjad Hussain
Films based on poems
Works based on Shahnameh